Bardish Chagger  (born April 6, 1980) is a Canadian politician who served as a Cabinet minister from 2015 to 2021. A member of the Liberal Party, Chagger has sat in the House of Commons as the Member of Parliament for the riding of Waterloo since the 2015 federal election.

Chagger previously held the portfolios of Leader of the Government in the House of Commons and Minister of Small Business and Tourism. Chagger was the first female Leader of the Government in the House of Commons in the history of Canada.

Early life and education
Chagger's parents immigrated to Waterloo from Punjab, India in the 1970s. Her family is Sikh. Her father, Gurminder "Gogi" Chagger, was active in the Liberal Party and an admirer of Prime Minister Pierre Trudeau. Chagger's first involvement in politics came in the 1993 federal election as a 13-year-old volunteer for Andrew Telegdi's successful campaign in Waterloo.

She attended the University of Waterloo, with aspirations to become a nurse, but she subsequently became an executive assistant to Telegdi, who represented Waterloo in the House of Commons for the Liberals from 1993 to 2008.

Chagger graduated from the University of Waterloo with a bachelor of science degree. After Telegedi's defeat in 2008, Chagger became a director of special events for the Kitchener-Waterloo Multicultural Centre.

Federal politics
Chagger volunteered for Justin Trudeau's 2013 party leadership bid, and subsequently became the Liberal Party's candidate in the newly reconstituted Waterloo riding. She took 49.7% of the vote and defeated two-term Conservative incumbent Peter Braid, who had earlier ousted her former employer Andrew Telegdi.

Minister for Small Business and Tourism
On November 4, 2015, Chagger was sworn in as Minister of Small Business and Tourism.

As a result of the July 18, 2018 cabinet shuffle, Chagger's responsibilities for Small Business were given to Mary Ng, and Mélanie Joly took on the responsibilities of Tourism.

Leader of the Government in the House of Commons
On August 19, 2016, Chagger was sworn in as Leader of the Government in the House of Commons replacing Dominic Leblanc in the position.  She retained her responsibilities as Minister of Small Business and Tourism until the July 18, 2018 cabinet shuffle.

On March 10, 2017, Chagger in her role as Government House Leader released a discussion paper titled Modernization of the Standing Orders of the House of Commons which sought to implement different ways that House of Commons procedure and practice could be improved to be more accountable, predictable and available to all Members of Parliament, and the public. The modernization paper suggested reforms to the House of Commons such as the implementation of electronic voting, the curtailment of Friday sittings, the reformation of Question Period, including a Prime Minister's Question Period, changes to the process of prorogation, greater powers for the Speaker to separate votes and committee studies on omnibus bills and legislative programming.

Opposition members of Parliament were concerned with the reforms proposed in the discussion paper, in particular with proposals to implement legislative programming and the elimination or change of Friday sittings in the House of Commons. In late April 2017, Chagger sent a letter to her counterparts, then New Democratic Party House Leader Murray Rankin and Conservative House Leader Candice Bergen, to inform them that the government would be abandoning several of the key proposals that were part of the modernization paper, such as changes to the Friday sitting, legislative programming, and electronic voting. They would continue however with proposals that were explicitly part of the 2015 Liberal election platform, including the decision to have a Prime Minister’s Question Period, requiring the government to issue a report following the use of prorogation, and allowing the speaker of the House of Commons to separate votes or committee studies on different parts of a bill that he or she deems to be omnibus.

WE Charity Ethics Investigation

In July 2020, Chagger was the first witness who testified in front of a parliamentary committee investigating awarding of a sole-sourced contract to run Canada Student Service Grant (CSSG) to WE Charity, an organization with ties to Prime Minister Justin Trudeau and Finance Minister Bill Morneau. Chagger was the one who signed the contracts with WE Charity, and had met with WE Charity days before student program was announced by Trudeau. Originally it was reported that WE charity would get a payment of at least $19.5 million, later it was disclosed that the contract was paying them up to $43.5 million to run student volunteer grant program. Chagger testified that it was the public service that recommended the grant program be outsourced to a third party via a contribution agreement, specifically it was Assistant Deputy Minister of Employment and Social Development Rachel Wernick.

Electoral record

References

External links
 
 Bio & mandate from the Prime Minister
 

Living people
Canadian politicians of Indian descent
Women members of the House of Commons of Canada
Liberal Party of Canada MPs
Members of the House of Commons of Canada from Ontario
Members of the King's Privy Council for Canada
Politicians from Waterloo, Ontario
University of Waterloo alumni
Women in Ontario politics
Members of the 29th Canadian Ministry
Canadian Sikhs
Women government ministers of Canada
1980 births
21st-century Canadian women politicians
Canadian politicians of Punjabi descent
Punjabi people